Gustavo Re (7 April 1908 – 5 June 1979) was a Spanish television presenter and actor.

Biography

On 10 October 1961 it was aired on TVE Amigos del martes, hosted by Artur Kaps, Franz Johan and Gustavo Re. They found a theater company named «Los vieneses», which was also collaborated by Herta Frankel, and Nati Mistral in Germany.

He appeared in Historias de la radio (1955), directed by José Luis Sáenz de Heredia and starring Francisco Rabal, Margarita Andrey, Tony Leblanc, José Luis Ozores and José Isbert; Totò d'Arabia (1964), directed by José Antonio de la Loma and starring Totò and Nieves Navarro; La diligencia de los condenados (1970), directed by Ignacio F. Iquino and starring Erika Blanc and Bruno Corazzari; and Un verano para matar (1972), directed by Antonio Isasi-Isasmendi and starring Karl Malden, Olivia Hussey and Christopher Mitchum.

He was honoured along Pepe da Rosa, Franz Johann, Andrés Pajares, Cassen, Fernando Esteso, Kiko, Tip y Coll, Lina Morgan, Zori and Santosin in the television special Humor en blanco y negro, aired in Cómo nos reímos in La 2.

Selected filmography

References

External links
 

1908 births
1979 deaths
Spanish television presenters
Spanish male film actors
Spanish male television actors